The Pablo Neruda Order of Artistic and Cultural Merit was created in 2004 by the National Council of Culture and the Arts of the government of Chile, as part of the commemoration of the 100th anniversary of the birth of Chilean poet Pablo Neruda (12 July 1904).

It is granted by the Minister of Culture to those national and international figures who have stood out for contributions made in the field of art and culture.

The Pablo Neruda Order of Merit was delivered for the first time on 5 July 2004 to the mayor of Barcelona, Joan Clos, and about 15 Ibero-American artists—among them, Miguel Bosé, Joan Manuel Serrat, Víctor Manuel, Ana Belén, Jorge Drexler, Julieta Venegas, and —who participated in the  musical tribute that took place at the Palau Sant Jordi, Barcelona.

Many national and international personalities have received this decoration since it was created.

Recipients

2005
 Carmen Beuchat, choreographer (5 March 2005 – International Women's Day)
 Isidora Aguirre, dramatist and writer (5 March 2005 – International Women's Day)
 María Elena Gertner, screenwriter, dramatist, and actress (5 March 2005 – International Women's Day)
 Roser Bru, visual artist (5 March 2005 – International Women's Day)
 , Bishop of Ancud (1 April 2005 – launch of Project SISMO)
 Roberto Parra, popular singer-songwriter; awarded to his widow Catalina Rojas (21 April 2005)
 Hernán Baldrich, dancer and choreographer (28 April 2005 – Day of the Dance)
 Tito Beltrán, Chilean tenor (25 July 2005)
 , choreographer (28 August 2005 – 2nd National Culture Convention)
 Tomás Chotzen, President of ANDES Foundation (28 August 2005 – 2nd National Culture Convention)
 , film critic (28 August 2005 – 2nd National Culture Convention)
 Patricio Guzmán, filmmaker (31 August 2005 – Chilean premiere of documentary Salvador Allende)
 Carmen Brito, filmmaker and restorer (17 October 2005 – National Film Inauguration Day)
 , film editor and director (17 October 2005 – National Film Inauguration Day)
 , filmmaker and documentalist (17 October 2005 – National Film Inauguration Day)
 Delia Domínguez, writer (14 December 2005 – Closing Quixote Reading Program)
 Marta Cruz-Coke, cultural manager (14 December 2005 – Closing Quixote Reading Program)
 Margot Loyola, folklorist (29 December 2005 – Valparaíso Cultural Carnival)

2006
 Bono (Paul David Hewson), U2 vocalist (26 February 2006 – La Moneda Palace)
 Alejandro Jodorowsky, writer and filmmaker (27 April 2006 – La Moneda Palace)
 Rubén Blades, musician and Minister of Tourism of Panama (27 December 2006 – La Moneda Palace)

2007
 Pina Bausch, German choreographer (11 January 2007 – La Moneda Palace)
 Luis Alarcón, Chilean actor (26 September 2007 – La Moneda Palace)
 Julio Bocca, Argentine dancer (24 November 2007 – La Moneda Palace)
 Leo Brouwer, Cuban composer and musician (1 December 2007 – La Moneda Palace)

2008
 Ennio Morricone, Italian film score composer (19 March 2008 – La Moneda Palace)

2009
 Isaac Frenkel, benefactor of music in Chile, ex-President of the Beethoven Foundation (27 August 2009 – La Moneda Palace)

2010
 Laura Esquivel, Mexican writer (21 January 2010 – La Moneda Palace)
 Cristina Gallardo-Domâs, lyrical singer (23 September 2010 – Los Angeles Opera Theater, California)
 Plácido Domingo, Spanish singer and opera director (23 September 2010 – Los Angeles Opera Theater, California)
 Daniel Catán, Mexican composer and musician (23 September 2010 – Los Angeles Opera Theater, California)
 Antonio Skármeta, writer (23 September 2010 – Los Angeles Opera Theater, California)

2012
 Miguel Castillo Didier, scholar of Greek culture (27 March 2014 – Sala América, Biblioteca Nacional)
 Lucho Gatica, singer (25 November 2012 – Chile Pavilion at the Guadalajara Book Fair, Mexico)

2013
 Los Jaivas, experimental rock band (30 September 2013 - Muelle Prat, Valparaíso)

2014
 Raquel Barros, folklorist, researcher, and academic (30 January 2014 - Severín Library, Valparaíso)
 Matilde Pérez, visual artist (30 January 2014 - Severín Library, Valparaíso)
 Paz Errázuriz, photographer (30 January 2014 - Severín Library, Valparaíso)
 Alejandro Sieveking, dramatist (30 January 2014 - Severín Library, Valparaíso)
 Luis Cárdenas, circus trapeze artist (30 January 2014 - Severín Library, Valparaíso)
 Themo Lobos, writer; posthumous decoration (30 January 2014 - Severín Library, Valparaíso)
 Cuarteto Latinoamericano, musical group (30 January 2014 - Severín Library, Valparaíso)
 Fernando Garcia, learned music composer (30 January 2014 - Severín Library, Valparaíso)
 Gabriel Valdés, diplomat and politician; posthumous decoration (30 January 2014 - Severín Library, Valparaíso)
 Los Blue Splendor, musical group (30 January 2014 - Severín Library, Valparaíso)
 Arturo Navarro, manager of the Mapocho Station Cultural Center (30 January 2014 - Severín Library, Valparaíso)
 Nicola Schiess, executive director of the Teatro del Lago, Frutillar (30 January 2014 - Severín Library, Valparaíso)

2015
 Quino, Argentine writer and cartoonist of Mafalda (15 January 2015 - Gabriela Mistral Cultural Center)

2016
 Valentín Trujillo, Chilean musician
 Vicente Bianchi, Chilean musician
 Bélgica Castro, Chilean actress
 , Chilean painter, dramatist, and cultural advisor
 Alicia del Carmen Cáceres, Chilean goldsmith
 Joan Turner, Chilean-British dancer

2017
 Jorge González, Chilean musician, singer, and composer; leader of the band Los Prisioneros (7 January 2017 - Summit of Chilean Rock, Estadio Nacional)
 Humberto Duvauchelle, Chilean actor and academic (11 July 2017 - University of Concepción Theater)
 Juan Allende-Blin, composer (9 September 2017 - University of Chile Theater)

2018
 Mauricio Celedón, Chilean theater director
 Mario Vargas Llosa, Peruvian writer, politician, and college professor
 Gustavo Dudamel, Venezuelan conductor and violinist

2021
 Sylvia Soublette, Chilean composer

See also
 Pablo Neruda Award, granted by the Neruda Foundation to poets under 40
 Pablo Neruda Ibero-American Poetry Award, also given by the CNCA

References

2004 establishments in Chile
Visual arts awards
Awards established in 2004
Orders, decorations, and medals of Chile
Pablo Neruda